Aisin Gioro Yunhu (允祜; 10 January 1712 – 12 February 1744), born Yinhu, formally known as Prince  of the Third Rank (貝勒), was an imperial prince of the Manchu ruled Qing Dynasty. He was the 32nd son of Kangxi Emperor and the 22nd who would survive to adulthood.

Life 
Yinhu was born on the third day of  December in the 51st year of Kangxi reign to Xuanye, the Kangxi Emperor, and Imperial Concubine Jin.

He changed his name to Yunhu when his elder brother, Yinzhen, ascended to the throne as Yongzheng Emperor.

In the 8th year of Yongzheng reign (1730), he was granted the title of Prince of the Third Rank. In  the 12th year of Yongzheng, he was awarded with the titles of Prince Jin of the Third Rank (晉貝勒).

In 1738, an official named Sun Jiagan reported that storehouses of Yunhu's manor were overflown with tributes. The report led to a trial at the Imperial Clan Court. Nevertheless, Yunhu did not lose his title.

He died in the 9th year of Qianlong reign (1743) and was posthumously conferred a title of Prince Gongqin of the Third Rank (恭勤貝勒)

Family 
Primary Consort

 First Primary Consort, of the Irgen Gioro clan (嫡夫人 伊爾根覺羅氏)
 Prince Honglong (贝子 弘昽; 22 November 1727 – 24 March 1784), Prince of the Fourth Rank, first son
 Princess of the Fourth Rank (17 June 1730 – 26 June 1775), first daughter
 Married Mabao (瑪寶) of the Magiya clan in 1745
 Princess of the Fourth Rank (2 September 1731 – 11 November 1785), second daughter
 Married  Jalafungga (扎拉丰阿) of the  Ulanghan clan (烏梁罕氏)

 Second Primary Consort, of the Uya clan (繼夫人 烏雅氏)
 Hongsong (镇国将军  弘嵩; 24 March 1743 – 9 July 1777), Hereditary General of the First Rank, fourth son
 Hongfeng ( 辅国将军  弘丰; 7 May 1744 – 10 November 1803), Hereditary General of the Second Rank, fifth son

Concubine

 Mistress, of the Cheng clan (妾 程氏)
 Ruibao (瑞保; 23 December 1742 – 17 December 1745), third son

 Mistress, of the Yang clan (妾 楊氏)
 Second son (17 January 1729 – 14 February 1731)
 Third daughter (19 December 1733 – 16 July 1805)
 Married Gengdouzha'er (庚都扎爾) of the Aohan Borjigin clan in 1747

 Mistress, of the Liu clan (妾 劉氏)
 Fourth Daughter (22 April 1739 – 1 April 1822)
 Married Tsereng Damba (色楞丹巴) of the Khorchin Borjigit clan in 1748

Ancestry

See also
 Royal and noble ranks of the Qing dynasty
 Ranks of imperial consorts in China#Qing

References 

 清皇室四谱
 

Qing dynasty imperial princes
Kangxi Emperor's sons
1712 births
1744 deaths